Riccardo Lucca (born 24 February 1997) is an Italian racing cyclist, who currently rides for UCI ProTeam .

Major results
2014
 3rd Time trial, National Junior Road Championships
2015
 2nd Overall Giro della Lunigiana
2019
 7th Giro del Medio Brenta
2021
 1st Trofeo Alcide Degasperi
2022
 1st Stage 4 Adriatica Ionica Race
 7th Overall Giro della Friuli Venezia Giulia
1st Stage 3
 7th Trofeo Alcide Degasperi

References

External links
 

1997 births
Living people
Italian male cyclists
People from Rovereto
Cyclists from Trentino-Alto Adige/Südtirol